CKGO (730 AM) is a commercial radio station in Vancouver, British Columbia, owned by Corus Entertainment and calling itself AM 730. It broadcasts a highway advisory format. Its radio studios and offices are in the TD Tower in Downtown Vancouver.

CKGO transmits with a power output of 50,000 watts, the maximum for Canadian AM stations. It uses a directional antenna at all times to protect other stations on 730 AM from interference. The transmitter is off British Columbia Highway 17 in Delta.

Format
In November 2006, CHMJ adopted an all-day, every day "all traffic" format, becoming the first station in North America to do so. In addition to traffic reports, the station also airs news briefs, weather reports and commercials.

It also carries BC Lions CFL football games and pre-game shows as well as Vancouver Whitecaps MLS soccer games and pre-game shows.

History

CKLG
On February 3, 1955, CKLG, owned by Lions Gate Broadcasting Ltd., began transmitting at 1070 kHz on the AM band with a 1,000-watt transmitter. Originally, studios and transmitter were both located in North Vancouver. The radio station was controlled by the Gordon Gibson family, who were involved in the logging business.  (Gordon Gibson, Sr, was known as "The Bull of the Woods.")

In 1958, the station changed frequencies from 1070 kHz to 730 kHz and increased power to 10,000 watts. The transmitter site was moved from North Vancouver to Delta. The station was sold to Moffat Broadcasting Ltd. in 1961, and in 1964 launched an FM sister station, the original CKLG-FM (now CFOX-FM), at 99.3 MHz. Throughout the 1960s, 1970s, and 1980s, CKLG (also known as LG73) played a variety of contemporary music, at times ranking as one of the most popular radio stations in the Vancouver radio market. In 1975, the station once again increased power, raising it to the current 50,000 watts.

The station's popularity declined in the early 1990s, as listeners switched to FM radio for music listening. In 1992, the Corus Radio Company (now Corus Entertainment) purchased Moffat's Vancouver radio properties. Corus tried a brief and unsuccessful attempt at a talk format from September 1993 to February 1994. The station returned to a hit music format, which lasted for the next seven years, despite new competition from station CKZZ-FM. CKZZ originally began as a rhythmic contemporary station in 1991 before moving towards a more mainstream Top 40/CHR format in 1996.

All-News CJNW
On February 1, 2001, at Midnight, after playing "I Will Remember You" by Sarah McLachlan, Corus changed the station's call letters to CJNW.  (The CKLG call sign was later transferred to Rogers Communications' CKLG-FM). CJNW adopted an all-news format referred to on-air as "NW2, all news radio, powered by CKNW".

Management wanted to leverage the Vancouver market dominance of co-owned talk station 980 CKNW, in light of the success of Rogers' all-news station CKWX News 1130. CJNW's all-news format lasted for approximately 14 months, and was abandoned in light of lower than expected ratings.

Mojo Radio

On May 28, 2002, at 5 a.m., CJNW discontinued the all-news format and began a nearly -month-long stunt of modern rock music, which also included a month of down time for a transmitter site upgrade. On August 6, at 6 a.m., the station changed call letters once again to CHMJ, and flipped to a hot talk format branded as MOJO 730, Talk Radio for Guys, which was based on sister station CFMJ in Toronto.

When that format failed to attract a large enough audience, the station changed to an all-sports format in February 2004, identified as MOJO Sports Radio, AM 730. It was the radio home of the Vancouver Giants junior hockey team, the Vancouver Whitecaps soccer team and other local sports events including UBC Thunderbirds and SFU Clansmen football and basketball games. It also carried Seattle Seahawks games from Seattle's KIRO. It was an ESPN Radio network affiliate and also shared some sports content with CKNW.

AM 730
On May 30, 2006, CHMJ terminated its all-sports format, switching to a stunt of a series of promotional content. The station re-launched at 7:30 a.m. on June 5, 2006 with a new format described as "continuous drive-time traffic and the best of talk". Programming consisted of continuous traffic reports during the morning and afternoon drive times and rebroadcasts of talk radio programming from CKNW. CHMJ also continued to provide play-by-play coverage of Vancouver Giants WHL hockey, Vancouver Whitecaps, and Seattle Seahawks NFL football.

On November 26, 2006, CHMJ flipped to a commercial traffic information format, airing only traffic reports, along with brief news and weather segments.

On July 3, 2016, CHMJ was knocked off the air temporarily by a fire that broke out in Burns Bog, where the station's transmitter site is located. The station was broadcast temporarily on the HD3 digital signal of sister station 101.1 CFMI-FM.

On April 8, 2021, Corus Entertainment announced it had acquired the radio broadcasting rights of the Vancouver Whitecaps FC MLS soccer team as well as BC Lions CFL football team, following Bell Media's decision to reformat CKST from sports to comedy. CHMJ will air games while sister station CKNW will air weekly programming related to the Whitecaps and BC Lions, in addition to an exclusive coaches' show.

On April 1, 2022, the station's call letters were changed to CKGO.

References

Leung, Wendy. "Mojo Sports Radio shuts down; 14 staff let go: Broadcasters McKeachie, McConnell leaving as radio station turns to traffic format," The Vancouver Sun, May 31, 2006.
McLellan, Wendy. "Vancouver loses its MOJO: Station never took off with sports; hopes listeners want traffic reports," The Vancouver Province, May 31, 2006.
Pap, Elliot. "Sports radio stations brimming with hockey coverage," The Vancouver Sun, September 23, 2005.
Schecter, Brian. "Radio's Jock Talk Wars," The Tyee, April 19, 2004.
Yu, Karl. "Jock Talk," Vancouver Courier, April 14, 2005.

External links
AM 730
Corus Entertainment Radio Stations
 

KGO
KGO
Kgo
Radio stations established in 1955
1955 establishments in British Columbia